Tattekere is a village in Kanakapura taluk in Ramanagara district, 40 km away from Bangalore. It has a population of 1293 in 2011. The village derives its name from a lake there which is a picnic spot, "tatte" means plate and "kere" means lake in native Kannada language.

A Mahadeshwara temple is there in the village on west side of the Tattekere lake, situated in elephant corridor of Bannerghatta National Park and it is a birdwatching place. Another tourist attraction Muthyalamaduvu is nearby.

References 

Villages in Ramanagara district
Lakes of Karnataka